Annari Viljoen (born 16 January 1987 in Bloemfontein) is a South African badminton player. In 2011, she won double title at the All-Africa Games in the women's and mixed doubles event, also won the silver medal in the team event. She competed at the 2012 Olympics in the doubles with Michelle Edwards, and made it to the quarter-finals.

Achievements

All-Africa Games 
Women's doubles

Mixed doubles

African Championships 
Women's doubles

Mixed doubles

BWF International Challenge/Series 
Women's doubles

Mixed doubles

  BWF International Challenge tournament
  BWF International Series tournament
  BWF Future Series tournament

References

External links 
 
 
 

1987 births
Living people
Sportspeople from Bloemfontein
South African female badminton players
Badminton players at the 2012 Summer Olympics
Olympic badminton players of South Africa
Competitors at the 2011 All-Africa Games
African Games gold medalists for South Africa
African Games silver medalists for South Africa
African Games medalists in badminton
21st-century South African women